Javier Suárez is the name of:

Javier Suárez (cyclist), Colombian cyclist
Javier Suárez (economist), Spanish economist